Duchy of Stargard may refer to:
 Duchy of Mecklenburg-Stargard, state in Mecklenburg, that existerd from 1352 to 1471
 Duchy of Pomerania-Stargard, state in Pomerania that existed from 1377 to 1478

See also 
 Stargard (disambiguation)